Zelin Coffee House was a cafe in Karachi, Pakistan that was frequented by the city's artistic, cultural and literary personalities.

References

Coffeehouses and cafés in Pakistan
Restaurants in Lahore